The 2021 season of Survivor: VIP is the eleventh season overall of the Israeli reality program Survivor and the fourth VIP season. The season featured 19 celebrity contestants competing against each other for the 1 million NIS prize. The season was filmed in the Philippines between April and May 2021 and aired on Reshet 13 from October 16, 2021 until April 2, 2022, when model Alla Eibinder defeated chef Jackie Azoulay in a live firemaking challenge after initially tying the jury's votes.

The season included the return of the Cabin Guard from the previous season, in which eliminated players lived at the Negotiation Cabin and competed in duels to remain in or return to the game. In this season, if the Cabin Guard won the duel to steal a former tribemate's vote at Tribal Council, the Cabin Guard and the newly eliminated player were subject to a vote by the remaining tribe members to determine who between them would be the Cabin Guard and who would be permanently eliminated from the game, replacing the challenges from the previous season.

Contestants
The 19 castaways include three former Survivor players — Liya Gil (who became famous after appearing in the first season in 2007), Michael Lewis (who was medically evacuated from the 2012 VIP season) and Zohar Strauss (who competed in the 2020 VIP season) — and formerly married couple Ohad Buzaglo (brother of Survivor: VIP 2020 winner Asi Buzaglo) and Fani Bar Moha.

Initially, Strauss was introduced as "the Masked Survivor" and sat out of the opening challenge, in which the 18 other players were divided into two tribes of nine: Apolaki, named after the Tagalog and Pangasinan god of the sun, and Libulan, named after the Visayan god of the moon. At the conclusion of the challenge, Strauss chose to join the victorious Apolaki tribe and revealed his identity to the others. On Day 23, the remaining players were merged into the Pag-asa tribe, named after the Filipino word for "hope".

Season summary

Voting history

References

External links
  

Survivor (Israeli TV series)
2021 Israeli television seasons
2022 Israeli television seasons
Television shows filmed in the Philippines
Entertainment scandals